The British Woodworking Federation is the trade association for the woodworking and joinery manufacturing industry in the UK. It has just around 600 members drawn from manufacturers, distributors and installers of timber doors (including fire doors), windows, conservatories, staircases, all forms of architectural joinery including interior fit out, as well as suppliers to the industry.

External links 
 

Woodworking
Trade associations based in the United Kingdom